Langholm Academy is a non-denominational, co-educational six-year comprehensive secondary school in Langholm, Scotland.

Currently, the school has 240 pupils. Th current building was opened in 1962.

The academy is associated with two primary schools: Langholm and Canonbie.

References

External links
Langholm Academy website
Inspection report
School data on BBC
Langholm Academy's page on Scottish Schools Online

Secondary schools in Dumfries and Galloway
1876 establishments in Scotland
Educational institutions established in 1876
Langholm